Delisile Blessing Ngwenya is a South African politician who has been one of the two national spokespeople of the Economic Freedom Fighters since 2020. She was a member of the National Assembly from 2019 to 2021. From 2016 to 2019, Ngwenya was a permanent delegate to the National Council of Provinces.

On 30 November 2021, she resigned from the National Assembly.

References

External links
Mrs Delisile Blessing Ngwenya at Parliament of South Africa

Living people
Year of birth missing (living people)
Place of birth missing (living people)
People from Gauteng
Economic Freedom Fighters politicians
Members of the National Assembly of South Africa
Women members of the National Assembly of South Africa
Members of the National Council of Provinces
Women members of the National Council of Provinces